Charlotte Rose Wilson (born 29 December 2000) is an Australian rules footballer playing for Collingwood in the AFL Women's (AFLW). She was drafted by Carlton with the 27th pick overall in the 2018 AFLW draft. Wilson made her AFLW debut in round 5 of the 2019 season.

In June 2022, Wilson was traded to Melbourne.

Wilson currently studies a Bachelor of Exercise and Sport Science at Deakin University.

References

External links 

Living people
2000 births
Australian rules footballers from Victoria (Australia)
Carlton Football Club (AFLW) players
Eastern Ranges players (NAB League Girls)